İshak Doğan (born 9 August 1990) is a Turkish professional footballer who plays as a left back for German club TSG Sprockhövel.

Career
Ishak made his Süper Lig debut on 19 November 2011.

References

External links
 
 
 
 
 

1990 births
Living people
Sportspeople from Hagen
Turkish footballers
Turkey B international footballers
Turkey international footballers
German footballers
German people of Turkish descent
SG Wattenscheid 09 players
Arminia Bielefeld players
MKE Ankaragücü footballers
Kardemir Karabükspor footballers
Trabzonspor footballers
Eskişehirspor footballers
Samsunspor footballers
Giresunspor footballers
Kahramanmaraşspor footballers
TSG Sprockhövel players
Regionalliga players
Süper Lig players
TFF First League players
TFF Second League players
Oberliga (football) players
Association football fullbacks
Association football defenders
Footballers from North Rhine-Westphalia